George Thomas McDermott (October 21, 1886 – January 19, 1937) was a United States circuit judge of the United States Court of Appeals for the Tenth Circuit and previously was a United States district judge of the United States District Court for the District of Kansas.

Education and career

Born in Winfield, Kansas, McDermott received a Bachelor of Philosophy from the University of Chicago in 1908 and a Juris Doctor from the University of Chicago Law School in 1909. He was in private practice in Topeka, Kansas from 1910 to 1917. He was in the United States Army as a Lieutenant from 1917 to 1919. He returned to private practice in Topeka from 1919 to 1928.

Federal judicial service

District Court service
McDermott was nominated by President Calvin Coolidge on January 12, 1928, to the United States District Court for the District of Kansas, to a new seat authorized by 40 Stat. 1156. He was confirmed by the United States Senate on January 16, 1928, and received his commission the same day. His service terminated on April 30, 1929, due to his elevation to the Tenth Circuit.

Court of Appeals service
McDermott was nominated by President Herbert Hoover on April 18, 1929, to the United States Court of Appeals for the Tenth Circuit, to a new seat authorized by 45 Stat. 1346. He was confirmed by the Senate on April 29, 1929, and received his commission on April 30, 1929. His service terminated on January 19, 1937, due to his death.

References

Sources
 

1886 births
1937 deaths
People from Winfield, Kansas
Judges of the United States District Court for the District of Kansas
United States district court judges appointed by Calvin Coolidge
Judges of the United States Court of Appeals for the Tenth Circuit
United States court of appeals judges appointed by Herbert Hoover
20th-century American judges
United States Army officers